Crédito Predial Português (literally Portuguese Land Credit) was a Portuguese financial organisation that was acquired by Banco Santander and became part of the group.

The bank was absorbed by Banco Santander Totta in 2004.

References

External links
Official Website

Banco Santander
Defunct banks of Portugal